Dansoman is a suburban town in the Greater Accra Region of Ghana, near the Accra and Takoradi districts of the Accra Metropolitan Area. It is known as one of the largest estates in West Africa.

History
Dansoman was founded by the late Nii Kojo Danso I in the late 1960s, and was named after him soon after (with "man" meaning town in Ga). When it was built, Dansoman was the largest planned urban settlement in the ECOWAS region.

Sport
Liberty Professionals, the local professional football club, play at the Carl Reindorf Park Stadium.

Schools
Dansoman has several schools, including senior high schools such as Dayspring Montessori International School, Ebenezer Senior High, St. Margaret Mary Senior High and Wesley Grammar Senior High. Its junior high schools are Christian Home School, St. Bernadette Soubirious Primary School, Oral Roberts International School, St Martin de Porres School,Mt. Olivet Methodist Academy, Alpha Beta Christian College, Ave Maria School and New Century Career Training Institute (NCCTI/NVTI).

Senior high schools

  Alpha Beta Christian College 
 Dansoman Secondary School
 Ebenezer Senior High School
 Rising Star Senior High School
 Seven Great Princes Senior High School
 St. Margret Mary Senior High School
 Wesley Grammar School
 Dansoman Technical School
 NCCTI~NVTI: New Century Career Training Institute
  His Majesty Academy (Senior High School)

Junior high schools

 Christian Home School
 Debest Academy
 Dansoman Baptist Academy
 Top Class Education Center
 Datus Complex School
 Ted Academy
 Lospat School Complex
 Riis Memorial School
 Alpha Beta Christian College 
 Kids Alliance Education Centre
 St. Martins De Porres
 Mother Mary's School
  St. Anthony's School
 St. Bernadette Soubirous School
 Emmanuel Presbyterian Preparatory School
 St. Jude's School
 Ave Maria School
 Dansoman '1' Junior High School
 Dansoman '2' Junior High School
 Dansoman '3' Junior High School
 Dansoman '4' Junior High School
 Christian Home School
 Seven Great Princes Academy
 St. Anthony's Preparatory School
 St. Martin de Porres School"
 Star of The Sea School
 Mount Olivet Methodist Academy
 Oddarene School
 Kiddie Class Education Centre
 Most Holy Heart School
 Goodwill Preparatory School
 Bishop John Daly Anglican School
 Gbegbeyise Junior High School
 Riches of Glory Academy
 Royal Standard Learning Centre
Christ Ambassadors School of Excellence
 Young Christian Int'l School
 Dayspring Montessori International School

Churches 

 Soka Gakkai International - Ghana, Dansoman.
 Winners' Chapel International, Dansoman
 Word Alive Chapel - Opposite Osofo Dadzie
 Royalhouse Chapel International (Datus School Complex)
 Bethel Baptist Church, Dansoman
 Bethesda Methodist Church, Mpoasei
The Church of Pentecost Ebenezer Down Assembly
Ebenezer Methodist Church, Dansoman
Apostolic Church Ghana, Dansoman
Emmanuel Presbyterian Church
Assemblies of God Ghana - Exhibition 
Musama Disco Christo Church (M.D.C.C.)
St. Augustine Anglican Church
Star of The Sea Catholic Church
Great Commission Church International(G.C.C.I)
Action Chapel International
Mt. Olivet Methodist Church
St. Margaret-Mary Catholic Church
The Church of Pentecost gbegbeyise
 "Kingdom Covenant Ministres International, Dansoman
Bread of Life Methodist Church
Reverend J.C. Mensah Memorial Methodist Church
Conquerors Chapel International
Seventh-Day Adventist Church (SDA)
International Central Gospel Church
Grace Chapel
Deeper Life
Watered Garden
Evangelical Presbyterian Church of Ghana Dansoman(Shalom Parish)
Akweibu Basic School
Holy Family Catholic Church on Kawashieman Rd.
Blessed schools complex
May's Educational center
Presbyterian Church of Ghana-Victory Congregation
Presbyterian Church of Ghana-Emmanuel Congregation
Christ Kingdom Charismatic Ministries International Dansoman Market
Gospel Light International Church (GLIC) - Achievers' Cathedral

Organizations
ID Ghana is a microfinance institution.

Notable people
Samini
Tic Tac
Yvonne Nelson
Emmanuel Tagoe
Ebony
E. L 
Terry Bonchaka
M3NSA

References

Populated places in the Greater Accra Region